Solar Philippines Power Project Holdings, Inc., or simply Solar Philippines, is a solar energy company based in the Philippines.

History
Solar Philippines was established in 2013 by Leandro Leviste. The company started small-scale, providing rooftop installment of solar panels it imported form China to clients. Its first project was the installment of solar panels at Central Mall in Biñan, Laguna. It also provided the rooftop solar panels of SM City North Edsa in Quezon City.

The company in 2016, was able to secure a subsidy from the Department of Energy enabling it to set up the Calatagan Solar Farm. This was followed by photovoltaic power stations in Batangas, Nueva Ecija and Tarlac.

A subsidiary, the Solar Philippines Nueva Ecija Corp. (SPNEC), which is intended to operate the Nueva Ecija Solar Farm as the world's largest solar farm was listed in the Philippine Stock Exchange in December 2021 SPNEC was renamed as SP New Energy Corp. in 2022. SPNEC began construction of the solar farm in 2021.

Solar farms
Calatagan Solar Farm – Calatagan, Batangas
Tarlac Solar Farm​ – Concepcion, Tarlac
Nueva Ecija Solar Farm – Peñaranda, Nueva Ecija

References

Solar energy companies of Asia
2013 establishments in the Philippines
Energy companies of the Philippines